Höljes is a minor locality situated in Torsby Municipality, Värmland County, Sweden with 79 inhabitants in 2015.

History 
The earliest farm in the area that later became Norra Finnskoga parish is Höljes. Erik Fernow's description of Värmland, Beskrivning öfwer Wermeland (1773 - 79), tells that there was only one inhabitant in northern Värmland during the 14th century and he lived in Höljes. His closest neighbor lived 150 km from him in Gräs in Sunnemo. The farm that Fernow is referring to is probably Gammalgården.

Another recorder believes that well into the 16th century there was only one village in Norra Finnskoga, and it was Höljes, located where the Klarälven makes an islet-adorned extension called Höljessjön.

Geography 
It is very isolated from any other settlements in Värmland and is in one of the most sparsely populated areas of Sweden. Höljes was originally the northernmost village of Sweden's southern region Götaland, before Värmland was declared part of Svealand in 1815. It still remains the northernmost locality in Värmland and is further north than Gävle in Sweden's greater northern region.

Climate 
Höljes has a climate sitting on the boundary between a subarctic and humid continental climate. Being situated in a valley at 230 m asl, it is the coldest station in Sweden south of the country's portion of the Scandinavian Mountains. As a result of its far inland position, the area has a rather unique climate by Swedish standards. Winters are as cold as in Skellefteå some four degrees north in the coastal region, but due to the absence of seasonal lag, the winter is front-loaded. This renders December to be colder than February. In the summer half of the year, temperatures are very dependent on the relative sun strength due to the lack of maritime moderation. As a result, April is similar to October in terms of general means and a lot of the warmest weather occurs early in summer. Even so, the all-time heat record was set in August 1975 when the village hit .

Due to the frost hollow aspects of its topography, Höljes has received frosts in every single month of the year. Even so, due to climate change summer frosts have become rarer events although those sometimes occur. The annual low temperature is averaging below freezing and the diurnal temperature variation is strong for most of the year.

Höljes maintains a sizeable snow pack in winter similar to the mountains and lower areas to its north. It also receives quite high precipitation levels by Swedish standards.

Sport
In the first weekend in July every year, the World RX of Sweden in the FIA World Rallycross Championship takes place in Höljesbanan, with large audience figures. Höljes, with its approximately 80 inhabitants (2015 the number was 79), is growing to Värmland's second most populous town. More than 35,000 people usually visit Höljes this weekend and follow the event on site.

At the 2015 event, a new audience record was broken, with 39,800 visitors. In 2017, it was a new record, with 45,000 visitors. In 2018, it was again a new audience record, with 51,600 visitors.

References 

Populated places in Torsby Municipality
Värmland